Kingston on Spey is a small coastal village in Moray, Scotland. It is situated immediately north of Garmouth at the western side of the mouth of the River Spey on the coast of the Moray Firth.  Kingston was founded in 1784 and was named after Kingston upon Hull, in East Yorkshire.

History
Kingston's past includes a large shipbuilding industry started in the 18th century.  This utilised the enormous amount of timber from the local surrounding forests. In 1829, some of the village homes were lost in the great flood, the "Muckle Spate".

Nature
Because of the dolphins, salmon, otters, osprey, seals and numerous waterfowl and other birds to be seen in the area, Kingston attracts birdwatchers and other nature enthusiasts. In addition to the Speyside Way, there are footpaths along the Lein, Burnside, the Browlands towards the village of Garmouth, the Spey Viaduct, and the local stone beaches. The Garmouth & Kingston Golf Club is located between the two villages.

Notable people
 Isabel Turner (1936–2021), Canadian politician, was born in Kingston

See also
Garmouth railway station - a station that once served the area.

Villages in Moray
River Spey